Rebecca “Becky” Haley Buller is an American bluegrass singer-songwriter, fiddle player and music teacher. Buller is the first woman to win the International Bluegrass Music Award for Fiddle Player of the Year as well as the first artist to win awards in both vocal and instrumental categories in the same year.

Biography 
The first single from Buller's new album Distance and Time, "The Barber's Fiddle", was released on March 27, 2020 and subsequently won Buller her ninth IBMA Award. The album's second single, "Tell the Truth (Shame the Devil)", featuring The Fairfield Four was released on May 1, 2020. Although originally touted for release in July, the album's release was pushed back due to October.

Band 
The Becky Buller Band
Becky Buller - vocals, fiddle
Jake Eddy - guitar
Daniel Hardin - bass
Wesley Lee - mandolin
Ned Luberecki - banjo

First Ladies of Bluegrass 
Buller is also a member of the First Ladies of Bluegrass, a supergroup featuring the first women to win the IBMA Award in each respective instrumental category. Buller won the Fiddle Player of the Year award in 2016.
Alison Brown - banjo, vocals
Becky Buller - fiddle, vocals
Sierra Hull - mandolin, vocals
Missy Raines - bass, vocals
Molly Tuttle - guitar, vocals

Personal life 
Buller studied public relations at East Tennessee State University in Johnson City, graduating in 2001.

She served as a member of the International Bluegrass Music Association board of directors between 2013 and 2017 and was chair of the IBMA Songwriter's Committee from 2013 to 2016.

She lives in Manchester, Tennessee with her husband and daughter.

Discography

Songwriting credits 
Credits taken from Buller's official website.

Awards and nominations

References 

Year of birth missing (living people)
Living people
American women singer-songwriters
American bluegrass fiddlers
American women music educators
21st-century American women
Singer-songwriters from Minnesota